Beatrice station, otherwise known as the Burlington Northern Depot in Beatrice, Nebraska is a historic railroad station which served trains of the Chicago, Burlington and Quincy Railroad (Burlington Route). The Neo-Classical Revival station was constructed in 1906. 

In 1940, the station had daily railcar service to Holdrege and twice daily railcar service on the line between Lincoln and Wymore. In addition, several mixed trains served the station. By 1947, the railcar service to Holdrege had become a mixed train and by May 1951, service to Lincoln and Wymore had been reduced to once daily. Dedicated passenger service to Beatrice was completely gone by the May 1965 timetable.

The station was listed on the National Register of Historic Places on May 2, 1975 and is now occupied by a museum.

References 
 Murphy, D. Burlington Northern Depot National Register of Historic Places Inventory-Nomination Form, 1975. On file at the National Park Service.

Railway stations in the United States opened in 1906
National Register of Historic Places in Gage County, Nebraska
Railway stations on the National Register of Historic Places in Nebraska
Former Chicago, Burlington and Quincy Railroad stations
1906 establishments in Nebraska
Former railway stations in Nebraska